Goldbach is a small river of Bavaria, Germany. It is a tributary of the Pegnitz in Nuremberg.

See also
List of rivers of Bavaria

Rivers of Bavaria
Nuremberg
Rivers of Germany